Caws is a surname, and may refer to:

Frank Caws (1846–1905), British architect
Joan Caws (died 2017), British checkers player
Mary Ann Caws (born 1933), American author, art historian, and literary critic 
Matthew Caws (born 1967), American lead singer of the band Nada Surf
Peter Caws (1931-2020), British American philosopher